was a feudal domain under the Tokugawa shogunate of Edo period Japan, located in Musashi Province (modern-day Saitama Prefecture), Japan. It was centered on Okabe jin'ya in what is now part of the city of Fukaya, Saitama.

History
The Abe clan were retainers of the Imagawa clan, and later went into the service of Tokugawa Ieyasu. Abe Nobumori was a 5250 koku hatamoto who served under Honda Masanobu at the Battle of Sekigahara. He subsequently served under Tokugawa Hidetada at the Siege of Osaka, but was not given an increase in revenues until he was awarded 4000 koku in 1636. In 1649, he was appointed commander of Osaka Castle, which came with a 10,000 koku stipend, which gave him enough for the title of daimyō. However, his 19,250 koku consisted of widely scattered holdings in Musashi, Settsu, Mikawa and Shimotsuke provinces.

His son, Abe Nobuyuki, gave 1000 koku to each of his two brothers in 1662; however, on his appointment as Deputy Commander of Osaka Castle in 1677, he received an increase of 3000 koku, bringing the domain to 20,250 koku. Nobuyuki’s son Abe Nobutomo received a further increase of 2000 koku in 1682. However, his son Abe Nobumine turned 2000 koku over to a younger brother in 1701. Nobumine also moved the seat of the domain to Okabe in Musashi Province.

Likewise, the 5th daimyo, Abe Nobukata, gave 1000 koku to his younger brother in 1706.

The 13th and final daimyō, Abe Nobuoki, participated in the suppression of the Mito Rebellion, but otherwise played little part in the Boshin War and pledged himself to the Meiji government in 1868. His holdings in Musashi were forfeited to the government, and he moved the seat of his domain to Hanhara in Mikawa Province (now part of Shinshiro, Aichi), where he continued to rule over the remainder of his domain until the abolition of the han system in 1871.

Holdings at the end of the Edo period
As with most domains in the han system, Okabe Domain consisted of several discontinuous territories calculated to provide the assigned kokudaka, based on periodic cadastral surveys and projected agricultural yields.

Musashi Province
10 villages in Hanzawa District
Kōzuke Province
4 villages in Nitta District
Mikawa Province
2 villages in Hoi District
9 villages in Yana District
Settsu Province
12 villages in Toyoshima District
3 villages in Nose District
3 villages in Kawabe District
6 villages in Arima District
Tanba Province
1 village in Ikaruga District
2 villages in Amata District

List of daimyōs

References

External links
 Okabe on "Edo 300 HTML"

Notes

Domains of Japan
1868 disestablishments in Japan
States and territories disestablished in 1868
Musashi Province
History of Saitama Prefecture